Antrodiella citrinella is a species of fungus belonging to the family Phanerochaetaceae.

It is native to Europe.

References

Phanerochaetaceae